Tattamangalam Kuthira Vela or Angadi Vela is a festival conducted in a small village called Tathamangalam in the Palakkad District of Kerala, south India. Kuthira means "horse" and Vela means "festival" in the Malayalam language. During the festival, a grant horse race is conducted by the local people. The riders are from the neighbouring state of Tamil Nadu.

One can see many volunteers painted in black with charcoal; these men are guards who control the people standing on the road side to see the race, this is also called Kari Vela.

During Kuthiravela, thousands of people gather on both sides of the state highway 27 from KSEB office to Vettakkaruppan swamy temple.

See also
 Nemmara Vela, festival in India
 Black face
 Zwarte Piet

References

External links 
Kuthira Vela 2007 Photographs - 28 April 2007
TattaMangalam Kuthira Vela Photographs - close to 200 photographs are available
 More related Photos - Kerala festivals
 Photoblog 
 TattaMangalam.com

Hindu festivals in Kerala
Festivals in Palakkad district